Allan R. Cullimore was the 3rd President of New Jersey Institute of Technology (NJIT) from 1920 until 1947.

Cullimore was a graduate of Massachusetts Institute of Technology.

Prior to this Cullimore had been a member of the faculty of the University of Toledo and then the first dean of the University of Delaware College of Engineering.

Cullimore was known to have published a book on the use of the slide-rule in 1915.

A number of things at NJIT are named after Cullimore including Cullimore Hall which houses the College of Science and Liberal Arts, the Newark College of Engineering Cullimore Doctoral Fellowship,  the Allan R. Cullimore Medal and the Cullimore Award.

Awards
 Benjamin Garner Lamme Award (1951) from the American Society for Engineering Education (ASME).

Sources

New Jersey Institute of Technology people
Massachusetts Institute of Technology alumni
University of Toledo faculty
University of Delaware faculty
Year of birth missing
Year of death missing
Place of birth missing
Heads of universities and colleges in the United States